Onari Duke  is a Nigerian lawyer and wife to Donald Duke. She is the chairman of the board of Dizengoff Nigeria and non-executive director at United Bank for Africa.

Education 
Duke graduated with LLB Hons from Ahmadu Bello University in 1983 and was at Nigerian Law School, Lagos in 1984.

References 

Living people
Ahmadu Bello University alumni
Nigerian business executives
Year of birth missing (living people)